The 1900 college football season ended with the Official NCAA Division I Football Records Book listing Yale as having been selected national champions.

Conference and program changes
 The Intercollegiate Conference of Faculty Representatives, commonly known as the Western Conference and the precursor to the modern Big Ten Conference, added two new members, Indiana and Iowa, to increase its membership to nine. It was after this expansion that the conference first gained the unofficial moniker Big Nine Conference.

Conference standings

Major conference standings

Independents

Minor conferences

See also
 1900 College Football All-America Team

References